Jean-Baptiste-Ange Tissier (6 March 1814, in Paris – 4 April 1876, in Nice) was a French painter in the Romantic style. He was primarily a portraitist and was an official artist of the Second Empire.

Biography 
His parents were originally from Soissons. He began his education there, then continued at the Minor Seminary in Laon. In 1835, he worked in the studios of Ary Scheffer and  Paul Delaroche while taking classes at the École des Beaux-arts.

He exhibited several portraits at the Salon in 1838 and continued to have showings there on a regular basis throughout his life. Many of his works were purchased by the government. They received awards in 1845 (Third Class Medal), 1847 and 1848 (Second Class Medal), 1855 (Third Class) and 1861 (Second Class). In 1852, along with Charles Landelle and Jean Gigoux, he decorated the waiting rooms for the "Court of Auditors" and the "Council of State" at Orsay Palace (now the Musée d'Orsay).

In 1861, in addition to the portraits, he presented one of his best known works; a depiction of Napoleon III greeting Emir Abdelkader at the Château d'Amboise (now displayed at Versailles). In 1866, he once again presented a scene with Napoleon III, this time approving plans for the Louvre submitted by Louis Visconti (also now at Versailles). In 1867, he was decorated with the Legion of Honor.

He also served as an art teacher. Under the Second Empire, most of his students were women, notably the Scandinavians Amalia Lindegren,  and Marie Aarestrup; the American Elizabeth Jane Gardner and the Peruvian . Inexplicably, none of his French students, male or female, are now remembered.

References

External links

Biography from the Dictionnaire de biographie contemporaine française et étrangère @ Google Books

1814 births
1876 deaths
19th-century French painters
French history painters
Recipients of the Legion of Honour